Asthenotricha anisobapta is a moth in the family Geometridae first described by Louis Beethoven Prout in 1932. It is found in the Democratic Republic of the Congo, Ethiopia, Kenya, Rwanda, Tanzania and Uganda.

References

Moths described in 1932
Asthenotricha
Moths of Africa